Ali Haydar Saltık (1923, Istanbul - 8 April 2011) was a Turkish general. He was Commander of the First Army of Turkey (1981 - 1983) and then Commander of the Turkish Army (1983 - 1985). He was Secretary-General of the Presidential Council.

In September 1979 General Kenan Evren ordered a hand-written report from Saltık on whether or not a coup was in order, or if the government merely needed a stern warning. The report, which recommended preparing for a coup, was delivered in six months. Evren kept the report in his office safe, and launched the 1980 Turkish coup d'état.

References 

1923 births
2011 deaths
Turkish Army generals
Commanders of the Turkish Land Forces